Steven Harris is a former American football wide receiver. He was signed by the Washington Redskins as an undrafted free agent in 2005. He played college football at Arkansas.

Professional career

Washington Redskins
Harris was placed on the injured reserve for the 2007 season after suffering a knee injury. He was waived by the team on March 17, 2008.

References

External links
Washington Redskins bio

1981 births
Living people
Players of American football from Miami
American football wide receivers
Arkansas Razorbacks football players
Washington Redskins players